Lucas County is the name of two counties in the United States:

 Lucas County, Iowa 
 Lucas County, Ohio